Charles R. Menzies is a Canadian anthropologist and full professor. He is a member of the Gitxaala Nation of northwestern British Columbia and an enrolled member of the Tlingit and Haida Indian Tribes of Alaska.

Early life and education 
Menzies was born in Prince Rupert, British Columbia, Canada, as the eldest of three children of Shirley Marie Menzies (née Naud), an elementary school teacher, and Harry Basil Menzies, a commercial fisherman.

Menzies grew up working on his family's commercial fishing boat. As a commercial fisherman Menzies worked in the halibut longline, salmon seining, and herring seining fisheries.

Menzies graduated from Prince Rupert Secondary School in 1980. He studied anthropology and sociology at Simon Fraser University. He has a MA from York University and a PhD from the City University of New York.

Career 
Menzies is a full professor in the Department of Anthropology and the Institute of Oceans and Fisheries at the University of British Columbia. His research focuses on the North Coast of BC and Brittany, France. His British Columbia Coast research includes archaeological, ethnographic, and political economic projects.

Bibliography 
 Menzies, Charles R. (2016) People of the Saltwater: An Ethnography of Git lax m'oon. Lincoln: University of Nebraska Press.
 Menzies, Charles R. (2011)   Red Flags and Lace Coiffes: Identity and Survival in a Breton Village. Toronto: University of Toronto Press.
 Menzies, Charles R. (ed.) (2006) Traditional Ecological Knowledge and Natural Resource Management.  Lincoln: University of Nebraska Press.

External links 
 Charles Menzies's webpage
 The Ethnographic Film Unit at UBC. Director: Charles Menzies
 Forests and Oceans for the Future

References 

Year of birth missing (living people)
Living people
21st-century First Nations people
Canadian anthropologists
First Nations academics
Haida people
Tlingit people
Academic staff of the University of British Columbia